The 1968 Houston Cougars football team, also known as the Houston Cougars, Houston, or UH, represented the University of Houston in the 1968 NCAA University Division football season. It was the 23rd year of season play for Houston. The team was coached by seventh-year head coach Bill Yeoman who was inducted into the College Football Hall of Fame in 2001. The team played its home games in the Houston Astrodome, a 53,000-person capacity stadium off-campus in Houston. Houston competed as a member of the NCAA in the University Division, independent of any athletic conference. It was their ninth year of doing so. At this time, Houston was on probation from the NCAA, and therefore was not eligible to compete in any post-season bowl games. Following the overall season, several players were selected for the 1969 NFL Draft. The 100 points scored by Houston in the November 23rd game against Tulsa remains the most points scored by a team in Division I college football history.

Schedule

Poll rankings

References

Houston
Houston Cougars football seasons
Houston Cougars football